The 2003 Samsung/RadioShack 500 was the seventh stock car race of the 2003 NASCAR Winston Cup Series season and the seventh iteration of the event. The race was held on Sunday, March 30, 2003, before a crowd of 215,000 in Fort Worth, Texas at Texas Motor Speedway, a 1.5 miles (2.4 km) permanent tri-oval shaped racetrack. The race took the scheduled 334 laps to complete. Penske Racing driver Ryan Newman would make a gamble near the end of the race, pitting for only two tires on the final round of pit stops. He would be able to pass and defend Dale Earnhardt, Inc. driver Dale Earnhardt Jr. to win his second career NASCAR Winston Cup Series win and his first win of the season. To fill out the podium, Jeff Gordon of Hendrick Motorsports would finish third.

Background 

Texas Motor Speedway is a speedway located in the northernmost portion of the U.S. city of Fort Worth, Texas – the portion located in Denton County, Texas. The track measures 1.5 miles (2.4 km) around and is banked 24 degrees in the turns, and is of the oval design, where the front straightaway juts outward slightly. The track layout is similar to Atlanta Motor Speedway and Charlotte Motor Speedway (formerly Lowe's Motor Speedway). The track is owned by Speedway Motorsports, Inc., the same company that owns Atlanta and Charlotte Motor Speedway, as well as the short-track Bristol Motor Speedway.

Entry list

Practice

First practice 
The first practice session was held on Friday, March 28, at 12:20 PM CST, and would last for 2 hours.

Second practice 
The second practice session was held on Saturday, March 29, at 10:30 AM CST, and would last for 45 minutes.

Third and final practice 
The third and final practice session, sometimes referred to as Happy Hour, was held on Saturday, March 29, at 12:10 PM CST, and would last for 45 minutes.

Qualifying 
Qualifying was held on Friday, March 28, at 4:05 PM CST. Each driver would have two laps to set a fastest time; the fastest of the two would count as their official qualifying lap. Positions 1-36 would be decided on time, while positions 37-43 would be based on provisionals. Six spots are awarded by the use of provisionals based on owner's points. The seventh is awarded to a past champion who has not otherwise qualified for the race. If no past champ needs the provisional, the next team in the owner points will be awarded a provisional.

Two drivers would fail to qualify: Kerry Earnhardt and David Starr.

Full qualifying results

Race results

References 

2003 NASCAR Winston Cup Series
NASCAR races at Texas Motor Speedway
March 2003 sports events in the United States
2003 in sports in Texas